Shpak may refer to:
Georgy Shpak, Russian politician
Marta Shpak, Ukrainian performer
Nira Shpak, Israeli politician
Oleksiy Shpak, Ukrainian sportsperson
Shpak 6844, minor planet